Betta tussyae is a species of gourami endemic to Malaysia where it is only known from Pahang.  It is an inhabitant of peat swamps.  This species grows to a length of  SL. The specific name honours Tussy Nagy, the wife of the Austrian aquarist Peter Nagy, in 1979 this couple were the first fish collectors to import this species into Europe.

References

tussyae
Taxa named by Dieter Schaller (aquarist)
Fish described in 1985